Cecil Douglas Horsley (26 July 190610 March 1953) was a British Anglican bishop who served as Bishop of Colombo then of Gibraltar in the mid 20th century.

He was born in Gillingham, Kent, on 26 July 1906 and educated at Brighton College and Queens' College, Cambridge, before embarking on an ecclesiastical career with curacies at Romsey Abbey and St Saviour's, Ealing. He was ordained priest on Trinity Sunday (15 June) 1930, by Theodore Woods, Bishop of Winchester, at Winchester Cathedral. After this he was vicar of St John the Evangelist, Upper Norwood, before his elevation to the episcopate in 1938. He was consecrated Bishop of Colombo on All Saints' Day (17 November) 1938, by Cosmo Lang, Archbishop of Canterbury, at Westminster Abbey.

He was translated to Gibraltar on 25 September 1947 (invested by Geoffrey Fisher, Archbishop of Canterbury, at Lambeth Palace Chapel). A sub-prelate of the Order of St John of Jerusalem, he died in post on 10 March 1953.

References

1906 births
People from Gillingham, Kent
People educated at Brighton College
Alumni of Queens' College, Cambridge
20th-century Anglican bishops in Asia
Anglican bishops of Colombo
20th-century Anglican bishops of Gibraltar
1953 deaths
Sub-Prelates of the Venerable Order of Saint John
British expatriates in Sri Lanka